The 2022 NRL Grand Final was the conclusive and premiership-deciding game of the 2022 National Rugby League season in Australia. It was contested between the Penrith Panthers and the Parramatta Eels on Sunday the 2nd of October at Accor Stadium in Sydney. Penrith, who were both the defending premiers and minor premiers, won the match 28–12 to claim their fourth premiership title, and their first back-to-back premierships in the club's 56-year history. Panthers fullback Dylan Edwards was awarded the Clive Churchill Medal for being judged as the man of the match.

The match was preceded by the 2022 NRL State Championship and the 2022 NRL Women's Grand Final. The grand final was attended by 82,415 spectators, and was broadcast live throughout Australia by the Nine Network.

Background

This was the first NRL grand final between the Penrith Panthers and the Parramatta Eels, and the second consecutive year that the grand final featured two Sydney-based clubs. The Panthers, who became the first side since the Melbourne Storm in 2018 to reach three consecutive grand finals,were aiming for a fourth premiership, after defeating Canberra Raiders in 1991, Sydney Roosters in 2003 and South Sydney Rabbitohs in 2021. It was Ivan Cleary's fourth grand final appearance as a coach, after previously losing with the New Zealand Warriors against Manly Sea Eagles in 2011, and losing with Penrith against Melbourne Storm in 2020.

Meanwhile, the Eels were aiming for their fifth premiership victory; their most recent being against Canterbury-Bankstown Bulldogs in 1986. Their last grand final appearance was a defeat to the Melbourne Storm in 2009. It was Brad Arthur's first grand final appearance as a coach.

The Panthers finished the 2022 regular season in first place after twenty wins and four losses, of which two were against the Eels. Parramatta finished fourth after sixteen wins and eight losses.

Route to the final

Penrith Panthers

The 2022 Penrith Panthers season was the 56th season in the club's history. Coached by Ivan Cleary and co-captained by Nathan Cleary and Isaah Yeo, the Panthers are competing in the National Rugby League's 2022 Telstra Premiership.

Parramatta Eels

The 2022 Parramatta Eels season was the 76th in the club's history. Coached by Brad Arthur and co-captained by Clinton Gutherson and Junior Paulo, they will compete in the NRL's 2022 Telstra Premiership. The season saw a club record membership tally of 34,264.

Pre-match

Team selection
Dylan Edwards, Stephen Crichton, Brian To'o, Jarome Luai, Nathan Cleary, Apisai Koroisau, James Fisher-Harris, Viliame Kikau, Liam Martin, Moses Leota and Isaah Yeo made their third-straight grand final appearance for Penrith, whilst Koroisau also played in the 2014 premiership decider for the South Sydney Rabbitohs. Ryan Matterson and Bailey Simonsson were the only players for Parramatta to have played in prior grand finals; Matterson won for the Sydney Roosters in 2018, while Simonsson played for the Canberra Raiders in 2019.

Broadcasting
The match was broadcast live on the Nine Network and delayed on Fox League in Australia as well as on Sky Sport in New Zealand. Radio broadcasters included ABC, Triple M, 2GB, SEN and Koori Radio.

Entertainment
On 23 September 2022, the pre-match entertainment acts for the grand final were announced. This included Jimmy Barnes, Mahalia Barnes, A.Girl, Diesel, Josh Teskey, Emma Donovan, Sheldon Riley and Bliss n Eso. The Australian national anthem was performed by Alinta Chidzey.

Officiating
Ashley Klein refereed the match, his second NRL grand final. Grant Atkins was the senior review official, and Phil Henderson and Drew Oultram were the touch judges. Gerard Sutton was the standby referee and David Munro the standby touch judge.

Attendance
The 2022 Grand Final was the first since the beginning of the COVID-19 pandemic to have no crowd restrictions. On 27 September 2022, the match was sold out.

Curtain-raiser matches
Curtain-raiser matches on the day were the NRL State Championship between the Norths Devils and the Penrith Panthers, and NRLW Grand Final between the Newcastle Knights and the Parramatta Eels. Both were shown live on the Nine Network in Australia.

Match

Statistics

Penrith Panthers:
 Most runs: 28 – Dylan Edwards
 Most running metres: 299 – Brian To'o
 Most line breaks: 3 – Brian To'o
 Most tackles: 45 – Liam Martin
 Most missed tackles: 5 – Liam Martin
 Most errors: 3 – Stephen Crichton

Parramatta Eels:
 Most runs: 20 –
 Clint Gutherson
 Dylan Brown
 Ryan Matterson
 Most running metres: 167 – Clint Gutherson
 Most line breaks: 1 –
 Clint Gutherson
 Maika Sivo
 Dylan Brown
 Most tackles: 56 – Reed Mahoney
 Most missed tackles: 11 – Isaiah Papali'i
 Most errors: 3 – 
 Clint Gutherson
 Waqa Blake

Post-match

Parramatta forward Ryan Matterson was charged by the match review with a grade one crusher tackle against Dylan Edwards. Matterson was criticised after taking an early guilty plea and electing to be suspended for three matches instead of taking a $4,000 fine. Matterson defended his decision telling reporters "I just feel that $4000 is pretty hefty considering I have already paid close to $4000 in fines this year for things that are absurd", with the forward also suggesting that the charge was not warranted.

Penrith players were criticised for their celebrations after their victory, with Sydney media identities outspoken against the way they celebrated. Jarome Luai came under scrutiny for a social media post that some found offensive. Former Penrith captain Greg Alexander and coach Ivan Cleary defended the players against the criticism.

Both grand final teams' players featured in squads selected for the 2021 Rugby League World Cup to be played in October–November 2022. Ten Panthers players were selected with the greatest representation (5) to play for Samoa. Parramatta had also had ten players selected, with the greatest representation (3) to play for New Zealand.

As premiership winners, Penrith earned the right to play in the World Club Challenge against 2022 Super League Grand Final winners St Helens. The match will be played on 18 February 2023 at BlueBet Stadium.

References

2022 NRL season
NRL Grand Finals
NRL
Rugby league in Sydney
Penrith Panthers matches
Parramatta Eels matches